Coronel FAP Carlos Ciriani Santa Rosa International Airport  is an airport serving Tacna, Peru. It is run by CORPAC S.A. (Corporación Peruana de Aeropuertos y Aviación Comercial S.A.), a government organization that oversees airport management.

Airlines and destinations

See also
Transport in Peru
List of airports in Peru

References

External links 
SkyVector Aeronautical Charts
OurAirports - Tacna

Airports in Peru
Buildings and structures in Tacna Region